Raffaele Masciocchi was an Italian cinematographer.

Selected filmography
 Destiny (1951)
 Daughters of Destiny (1954)
 Lazzarella (1957)
 The Sword and the Cross (1958)
 Tuppe tuppe, Marescià! (1958)
 Hannibal (1959)
 Queen of the Pirates (1960)
 The Giants of Thessaly (1960)
 Robin Hood and the Pirates (1960)
 Sword of the Conqueror (1961)
 Battle of the Worlds (1961)
 The Seventh Sword (1962)
 Charge of the Black Lancers (1962)
 The Magnificent Adventurer (1963)
 The Ghost (1963)
 Gold for the Caesars (1963)
 Hercules Against the Barbarians (1964)
 Revenge of The Gladiators (1964)
 James Tont operazione U.N.O. (1965)

References

Bibliography 
 Thomas Weisser. Spaghetti Westerns--the Good, the Bad and the Violent: A Comprehensive, Illustrated Filmography of 558 Eurowesterns and Their Personnel, 1961–1977. McFarland, 2005.

External links 
 

Year of birth unknown
Year of death unknown
Italian cinematographers